Ap Lo Chun is a small island in the New Territories of Hong Kong. It is under the administration of North District.

Location
Ap Lo Chun is located in Ap Chau Bay (Ap Chau Hoi) of Crooked Harbour, between Ap Chau  in the east and Sai Ap Chau in the west, with the islet of Ap Tan Pai nearby in the northeast.

Conservation
Ap Lo Chun is part of the Double Haven Special Area that covers 0.8 hectare and was designated in 2011. The Special Area includes the islets Pak Ka Chau, Yan Chau (both within Double Haven) as well as the islet of Ap Lo Chun and a part of Ap Chau (both within Crooked Harbour). The geology of the area is characterised by sedimentary rocks of the Jurassic and Cretaceous periods.

References

Uninhabited islands of Hong Kong
North District, Hong Kong
Islands of Hong Kong